Edward Kemboi is a Kenyan middle-distance runner who competes professionally for Atlanta Track Club and Mizuno. He won the 800 metres at 2015 NCAA Division I Outdoor Track and Field Championships and at the 2015 NCAA Division I Indoor Track and Field Championships.

Collegiate
In college, Kemboi competed for Iowa State University. He won seven Big 12 titles during his four years at the school.

Professional
Kemboi represents Kenya in international competition. He competes for and trains with Atlanta Track Club where his coached by Amy and Andrew Begley. Fellow Iowa State Cyclone Patrick Peterson is also part of the team.

References

External links
 
 Iowa State profile

Living people
1993 births
Kenyan male middle-distance runners
Iowa State Cyclones men's track and field athletes
People from Uasin Gishu County
Sportspeople from Iowa
Track and field athletes from Oregon